Blue Hen Farm is a historic home located at Newark in New Castle County, Delaware.  It is a stuccoed three story, six bay building built in four phases.  The earliest part of the structure dates to the mid-19th century.

It was added to the National Register of Historic Places in 1983.

References

Houses on the National Register of Historic Places in Delaware
Houses in Newark, Delaware
National Register of Historic Places in New Castle County, Delaware